Ayman Hefny (born 31 December 1985) is an Egyptian footballer who plays as an attacking midfielder for Egyptian Premier League club Zamalek and the Egypt national team.

Honours
Zamalek
Egyptian Premier League:(3) 2014–15, 2020-21, 2021-22

Egypt Cup:(5) 2015, 2016, 2017–18, 2018–19 , 2021
Egyptian Super Cup:(1) 2016
Saudi-Egyptian Super Cup:(1) 2018
CAF Confederation Cup:(1) 2018–19

References

1985 births
Egyptian footballers
Wadi Degla SC players
Misr Lel Makkasa SC players
Tala'ea El Gaish SC players
Zamalek SC players
Egyptian expatriate footballers
Egyptian Premier League players
Association football midfielders
Living people